Little Burke River may refer to:
Little Burke River (New South Wales), Australia, a tributary of Burke River (New South Wales)
Little Burke River (Queensland), Australia.

See also
Burke River (disambiguation)